Global Harvest Ministries is a parachurch organisation, focusing on evangelism and church planting around the world.

The World Prayer Center is an associate organisation that exists in the same building. The organisation was created by C. Peter Wagner.

External links
 Official website
 International Society of Deliverance Ministries
 Wagner Leadership Institute
 Critique of both Global Harvest Ministries and the World Prayer Center

Christian parachurch organizations